Celypha rivulana is a small moth species of the family Tortricidae. It is found in most of Europe.

The wingspan is 16–18 mm.
The forewing termen is faintly sinuate. The ground colour is whitish, striated with brown and grey. A sinuate fascia limits the basal patch. The central fascia has a posterior indented prominence in the middle. There is a subtriangular praetornal spot, a straight subapical fascia, and a triangular apical spot trifurcate on costa all ferruginous - brown more or less sprinkled with black. The hindwings are light grey. The larva dull yellow-green; head and plate of 2 black. Julius von Kennel provides a full description.

The adult moths fly in June, July and August.

The larvae are polyphagous, feeding on a variety of herbaceous plants, including Genista tinctoria, Hieracium, Lotus and Plantago.

References

Ian Kimber 2011 UKMoths
Gypsonoma rivulana Oku, 2005 (Gypsonoma), Tinea 18 (supplement 3): 107. TL: Japan
Syricoris rivulana Scopoli, 1763 (Phalaena), Entomologia Carniolica: 237. TL: Slovenia

External links
Fauna Europaea
Funet
Lepidoptera of Belgium
Suffolk Moths
National History Museum

Moths described in 1763
Tortricidae of Europe
Taxa named by Giovanni Antonio Scopoli